The University of Wisconsin Credit Union (doing business as UW Credit Union) is a credit union headquartered in Madison, Wisconsin. As of 2021, UW Credit Union has more than 300,000 members with $4.8 billion in assets and is the third largest credit union in the state of Wisconsin.  UW Credit Union currently operates 29 full-service branches throughout the Madison and Milwaukee metropolitan areas, as well as single locations at or near UW System campuses in Whitewater, Green Bay, La Crosse, Oshkosh, and Stevens Point. It also provides over 100 surcharge-free ATMs in Wisconsin. UW Credit Union provides an array of financial services including educational loans, mortgages, consumer loans, checking, savings and investment products, credit and debit cards. UW Credit Union also offers digital banking services such as Web Branch (online banking), Mobile App and Wallet, Zelle, mobile deposit, online bill payment, automated phone banking system, and money transfers.

History
Founded in 1931 by six University of Wisconsin–Madison professors in the basement of the UW Student Housing Bureau, it was originally known as the University Faculty Credit Union (UFCU). In 1970, the name was changed to the University of Wisconsin Credit Union.

Membership eligibility
UW Credit Union membership is open to students, faculty, staff, and alumni of the University of Wisconsin System, including all 26 campuses and the University of Wisconsin–Extension—as well as their immediate family and households. Likewise, Edgewood College and Madison College students, faculty, staff, alumni are eligible to join. Current and former employees of UW Health, the Wisconsin Interscholastic Athletic Association, Covance Clinical Research Units, and members of the community that live, work or attend school within  of a branch are also welcome to be members.

Membership is also available to any Wisconsin resident who is enrolled or has attended an accredited institution of higher education nationwide.

References

External links
 Official Website
 Branch Locations
UWCU Newsroom

Credit unions based in Wisconsin
University of Wisconsin System
Companies based in Madison, Wisconsin
Banks established in 1931
American companies established in 1931
1931 establishments in Wisconsin